Environment and Rights (Экология и Право) is a quarterly magazine published by the Bellona Environmental Transparency Center. Angelina Davydova has been its editor-in-chief since 2016. First publication was printed in Russian in 2002. The main focus of the magazine was to promote environmental rights in Russia.

Former editors
The magazine's founding editor from 2002 to 2008 was Grigory Pasko. According to the Bellona's website, Pasko was imprisoned in 2002 for "coverage of the violations of nuclear safety at the naval bases of the Russian Pacific Fleet."

References

External links
  (in Russian)

2002 establishments in Russia
Environmental law in Russia
Environmental magazines
Magazines established in 2002
Magazines published in Saint Petersburg
Quarterly magazines published in Russia
Russian-language magazines